Qeshlaq-e Aba (also Romanized as Qeshlāq-e ‘Abā; also known as ‘Abā Qeshlāqī) is a village in Angut-e Sharqi Rural District, Anguti District, Germi County, Ardabil Province, Iran. At the 2006 census, its population was 161, in 36 families.

References 

Towns and villages in Germi County